Project 23131 is a series of replenishment oilers, developed by the Spetssudoproect JSC and being constructed by the Zaliv shipyard for the Russian Navy since December 2014. It is a heavier version and further development of Project 23130 replenishment oiler .

History
The first two Project 23131 ships, serial numbers "301" and "302", were laid down during a keel laying ceremony at the Zaliv shipyard, Kerch on 26 December 2014. They were originally planned to enter service in 2018. In November 2018, Zaliv shipyard reported that formation of the ships' hulls and superstructures was complete and that work was currently underway to prepare the two hulls for electrical installations. As of 2022, neither ship is complete.

Ships

See also
List of active Russian Navy ships
Future of the Russian Navy

References

External links
Project 23131 at RussianShips

Auxiliary replenishment ship classes
Auxiliary ships of the Russian Navy
Oilers